"Let Go" was Bonnie Pink's fourth studio album released under the East West Japan label on April 5, 2000. It was recorded in Hollywood, California, and produced by Bonnie Pink and Mitchell Froom.

Track listing

Charts

Album

Singles

Notes 

2000 albums
Bonnie Pink albums
Albums produced by Mitchell Froom